The 1965 Diamond "D" Championship the Canadian women's curling championship was held from February 22 to 25, 1965  at the Mayflower Curling Club in Halifax, Nova Scotia.

Team Manitoba, who was skipped by Peggy Casselman won the event by finishing the round robin with an 8-1 record. This was Manitoba's first championship.

This was the first championship that would come down to a "winner take all" final draw as both Alberta and Manitoba entered their matchup in the final draw with identical 7–1 records. Manitoba jumped out to a 6–0 lead after four ends and despite an Alberta comeback, Manitoba would hold off Alberta 7–5 to capture the championship. Alberta would finish runner-up as Prince Edward Island scored three in the last end against Nova Scotia to win 9–8 in their final game and thus avoided a tiebreaker playoff between Alberta and Nova Scotia for runner-up.

This championship would set a record for the fewest extra end games in one tournament as Ontario's 13–11 victory over Quebec in Draw 3 was the only game that went to an extra end in the tournament.

Teams
The teams are listed as follows:

Round robin standings
Final Round Robin standings

Round robin results
All draw times are listed in Atlantic Standard Time (UTC−04:00).

Draw 1 
Monday, February 22, 3:00 pm

Draw 2 
Monday, February 22, 8:00 pm

Draw 3 
Tuesday, February 23, 2:30 pm

Draw 4 
Tuesday, February 23, 7:30 pm

Draw 5 
Wednesday, February 24, 9:00 am

Draw 6 
Wednesday, February 24, 3:00 pm

Draw 7 
Wednesday, February 24, 8:00 pm

Draw 8 
Thursday, February 25, 9:00 am

Draw 9 
Thursday, February 25, 7:30 pm

References

Diamond D Championship, 1965
Scotties Tournament of Hearts
Curling competitions in Halifax, Nova Scotia
Diamond D Championship
Diamond D Championship
Diamond D Championship
Diamond D Championship